Ben da Silva Cristóvão (born 8 June 1987), known professionally as Ben Cristovao or Benny Cristo, is a Czech singer, lyric writer, sportsman, and actor. He was nominated to represent the Czech Republic in the Eurovision Song Contest 2020 in Rotterdam after winning the national round with the song Kemama. After the contest was cancelled because of the COVID-19 pandemic, Czech Television confirmed on that Cristo would instead represent the Czech Republic in the 2021 contest. Benny Cristo sings in both Czech and English.

Personal life
Cristo's mother is Czech and his father, Bénis Cristóvão, is from Angola. He has three younger siblings from the same father but with different mothers. The girls' mother is Ana Bela Cristovão, who is now married to Bénis Cristóvão.

Music career
In 2009, Benny Cristo was one of the finalists on the talent show Česko Slovenská SuperStar. The experiences gained in this show motivated him to focus on his singing career. In 2010, he released his debut album, Definitely Different. A year later, in 2011, his second studio album, called Benny Cristo, came out. The album contains two collaborations with Monika Bagárová, another contestant from Česko Slovenská SuperStar. Cristo was also a supporting act for the American electro-pop group Far East Movement and the Cuban-American rapper Pitbull.

In 2013, Cristo was nominated for the Český slavík award in the category "Music Video of the Year" for the song "Bomby".
The same year, he released his third studio album, Made in Czechoslovakia.

Cristo, together with other musicians, including David Koller, Dan Bárta, Michael Kocáb, and Vojta Dyk, participated in the civic initiative "Nikagda nězabuděm" (Eng.: we will never forget), appealing to people's participation in the 2013 elections and warning of the return of communism and inclination towards Russia.

In 2016, Cristo won the Český slavík award in the category "Most Streamed Czech Song" with the track "ASIO". He did not attend the award ceremony, however. As he later stated to the media, he did not want to be in the same room as the Czech group Ortel, known for their xenophobic texts.
Also in 2016, Cristo recorded a cover of the David Koller song "Nic není na stálo". This cover was released together with other songs from  artists such as Katarzia, Kato, Mucha, and Vladimír 518, on David Koller's album David Koller & Friends.

In 2017, Cristo issued the EP Poslední. Instead of being released as a standard CD, fans were able to download it through a QR code on a t-shirt specifically designed for the promotion.

In 2018, Benny Cristo performed at the Anděl Awards ceremony, singing his song "Nohy", with the guest appearance of Jiří Korn. He later collaborated with Mária Čírová on the theme song for the  movie Backstage (directed by Andrea Sedláčková). The song is called "Padam". Cristo himself appears in the film as a judge in a dance competition. In the same year, he became a judge of the talent competition Česko Slovenská Superstar.

In 2019, Cristo released the six-song EP Kontakt.
To mark 10 years on the music scene, Cristo held a concert at Prague's O2 Arena.

Cristo was selected to represent his country in the Eurovision Song Contest 2020 after winning the national round. He was to perform in Rotterdam, the Netherlands, with the song "Kemama". However, the event has been cancelled as a result of the COVID-19 pandemic. In May 2020, it was confirmed that Cristo would sing for the Czech Republic in the 2021 event with a new song. His entry for 2021, "Omaga", was released on 16 February 2021. He sang in the second semifinal of the contest, but did not qualify for the final, finishing 15th with 23 points.

Activism
Benny Cristo is vegan and an animal rights activist. He takes part in various projects and campaigns supporting animal rights. In 2018, he worked together with the organisation Obránci zvířat (OBRAZ) and made a voiceover for one of their campaign videos called "Jak to snáší". This dealt with the issue of caged hens. For a number of years, he was also the face of the project Seznam se bezpečně. By visiting  elementary schools, he actively warned students against the different dangers they could face on the internet and advised how to eventually address some of the issues. He is also the ambassador of the initiative zálohujeme.cz, advocating for the idea of plastic bottle deposit schemes.

Sport career
Alongside his musical career, Benny is also an active sportsman. In the last couple of years, he has been doing Brazilian jiu-jitsu on a competitive level and taking part in competitions all around the world. In September 2016, he participated in the Asian Championship and placed third in the medium heavy (up to 88 kg) white belt category. In October of the same year, he participated in the prestigious international championship Madrid Open and won the gold medal in the same category. In 2017, he won the title of European Champion (white belt).

Benny Cristo represents the academy Jungle BJJ. In Prague, the academy is led by the instructor Fernando Nascimento Araujo, holder of a black belt 4th degree.

In the past, Benny also snowboarded professionally, placing first in the Czech Cup series 4x4 in 2006.

Discography

Studio albums

Extended plays

Singles

References

External links
 Official website

1987 births
Living people
English-language singers from the Czech Republic
21st-century Czech male singers
Czech people of Angolan descent
Actors from Plzeň
Eurovision Song Contest entrants of 2020
Eurovision Song Contest entrants for the Czech Republic
Czech male judoka
Eurovision Song Contest entrants of 2021
Musicians from Plzeň